Delicate Tension is the second official album by American musician R. Stevie Moore, issued in a small pressing by his uncle Harry Palmer's H.P. Music in November 1978. The album is the follow-up to the compilation Phonography (1976). It mainly contains Moore's new songs and sound experiments captured since his recent move north from Nashville to New Jersey, all recorded on 1/4 track 7½ ips reel-to-reel stereo tape decks. The album cover was designed by Moore himself.

"I Go Into Your Mind" was later remade and released on 2006's The Yung & Moore Show.

Reissues
Delicate Tension was reissued on compact disc in July 2004 by Cordelia Records in the UK. It included 10 bonus tracks, including the complete Stance e.p. from September 1978, as well as rare photos and an extensive e-mail interview by Jenkins.

Track listing

Notes
 Previously released tracks according to Moore.

Personnel 
R. Stevie Moore – guitar, bass guitar, keyboards, vocals
Mark Cudnik - mailed drum tracks (1-5, 14)
Irwin Chusid - drums (11)

References

External links
 RSM's Delicate Tension web page
 Delicate Tension on Bandcamp
 Cordelia Records

R. Stevie Moore albums
1978 albums